Leelawadee may refer to:
 a flowering shrub known primarily as Plumeria or frangipani
 a font for the Thai script present on Microsoft Windows systems, related to Segoe UI: see Segoe#Related fonts